Hoher Straußberg is a mountain of Bavaria, Germany.

Mountains of Bavaria
Ammergau Alps
Mountains of the Alps